Perseus OB1 is an OB association in the Northern Celestial Hemisphere in the constellation Perseus. It is centered around the double cluster (NGC 869 and NGC 884), and has lent its name to the Perseus Arm of the Milky Way. The brightest member of the association is the blue supergiant 9 Persei.

References

Stellar associations
Carina (constellation)
Perseus (constellation)